Bank of the United States v. Deveaux,  is an early US corporate law case decided by the US Supreme Court. It held that corporations have the capacity to sue in federal court on grounds of diversity under article three, section two of the United States Constitution. It was the first Supreme Court case to examine corporate rights and, while it is rarely featured prominently in US legal history, it set an important precedent for the legal rights of corporations, particularly with regard to corporate personhood. 

The court ruled that corporations composed of citizens from one state may sue on behalf of those citizens in circuit court citizens from another state. The court specifies that while corporations may sue on behalf of citizens, corporations cannot be citizens. In other words, the court ruled that while only citizens may sue in court, they may do so under a corporate name.

Background 
Georgian Jeffersonian politicians first provoked a court case when, in 1805, they imposed a tax on the Bank of the United States' locally held capital. Many Jeffersonian Democrats strongly opposed the chartering of a national bank as a violation of states rights and wanted to see it dissolved. However, because state governments lack the power to directly legislate federal institutions under the supremacy clause, Jeffersonian Democrats in Georgia chose another route to fight back against the Bank: taxes. The lawmakers hoped that heavy taxes on the bank would drive it out of Georgia.

The Bank decided to ignore the tax in an act of civil disobedience, hoping that a conflict with the state would bring the question of corporate rights in front of the Supreme Court.

After the Bank refused to pay the new taxes, a Georgian tax collector named Peter Deveaux decided to take matters into his own hands, forcibly confiscating two boxes of silver from the Savannah branch of the Bank. The Bank sued Deveaux in Federal court, circumventing the Georgia state court for fear of bias. The case came in front of the Supreme Court, headed by John Marshall, a Federalist and supporter of the bank.

Syllabus 
William Cranch, the Reporter of Decision of the Supreme Court, summarized the decision of the court. A corporation aggregate composed of citizens of one state may sue a citizen of another state in the circuit court of the United States.

Where the jurisdiction of the courts of the United States depends not on the character of the parties, but upon the nature of the case, the circuit courts derive no jurisdiction from the Judiciary Act except in case of a controversy between citizens of the same state claiming lands under grants from different states.

No right is conferred on the bank by its act of incorporation to sue in the federal courts.  A corporation aggregate cannot, in its corporate capacity, be a citizen.

The duties of this Court to exercise jurisdiction where it is conferred and not to usurp it where it is not conferred are of equal obligation.  The Constitution therefore and the law are to be expounded without a leaning the one way or the other, according to those general principles which usually govern in the construction of fundamental or other laws.

A constitution, from its nature, deals in generals, not in detail.  Its framers cannot perceive minute distinctions which arise in the progress of the nation, and therefore confine it to the establishment of broad and general principles.

The Judicial Department was introduced into the American Constitution under impressions and with views which are too apparent not to be perceived by all.  However true the fact may be that the tribunals of the states will administer justice as impartially as those of the nation to parties of every description, it is not less true that the Constitution itself either entertains apprehensions on this subject or views with such indulgence the possible fears and apprehensions of suitors that it has established national tribunals for the decision of controversies between aliens and a citizen or between citizens of different states.

Judgment
Chief Justice John Marshall gave the leading decision.

See also
US corporate law

Notes

United States corporate case law
United States Supreme Court cases
John Marshall